Gert Cloete (born 11 September 1988) is a South African cricketer. He made his List A debut on 8 March 2020, for Northern Cape in the 2019–20 CSA Provincial One-Day Challenge.

References

External links
 

1988 births
Living people
South African cricketers
Northern Cape cricketers
Place of birth missing (living people)